YHSS may refer to:

Yangchenphug Higher Secondary School, a co-ed public high school in Thimphu, Bhutan
Yuhua Secondary School, a secondary school in Jurong West, Singapore